The Southern Pacific Railroad Depot is located at 201 W. Main Street in Casa Grande, Arizona. It was designated on the National Register of Historic Places, but removed from the listing on January 31, 2019, after being destroyed by a fire on June 5, 2009

See also
 National Register of Historic Places listings in Pinal County, Arizona

References

Buildings and structures in Casa Grande, Arizona
Former National Register of Historic Places in Arizona
Former railway stations in Arizona
Former Southern Pacific Railroad stations